Cobra is an American action/adventure television series starring Michael Dudikoff. It ran for one season in syndication from 1993 to 1994.

Premise
Robert "Scandal" Jackson, Jr., is an ex–Navy SEAL who went A.W.O.L. after refusing to blow up an enemy command center housing civilians. He disappeared to the wilderness of Alaska, changing his name and appearance, and became a teacher in a small Inuit community. But a part of his past caught up to him and he was shot in the face, his comatose body left for dead. He awoke in the hospital three weeks later and found himself with a new face and a new chance at life, thanks to a woman named Danielle LaPoint.

Danielle offered him a job with "Cobra", an undercover anti-crime agency that provides justice for victims who haven't benefited from the system. Scandal is reluctant to leave his Alaskan life behind, but then Danielle's boss, Dallas Cassel, makes him an offer he can't refuse: the chance to catch the man who murdered his father five years earlier. From behind the wheel of his classic AC Cobra, Scandal dispenses justice in the fictional Bay City.

Background
Starring Michael Dudikoff (the American Ninja series), Allison Hossack, and James Tolkan (the Back to the Future trilogy), Cobra was created by television producer Stephen J. Cannell, along with Steven Long Mitchell and Craig W. Van Sickle (both of whom later went on to create/executive produce The Pretender for NBC), and was filmed on location in Vancouver, British Columbia, Canada. Lee Goldberg & William Rabkin were the show's supervising producers and went on to executive produce Diagnosis: Murder and Martial Law, among other series. Matt Dearborn, an executive consultant on Cobra, produced several Disney Channel sitcoms, including Even Stevens.

Cobra was originally titled Viper. However, Chrysler Corp. sued Stephen J. Cannell for trademark infringement, and also because Chrysler was already working with CBS on a series called Viper that was to feature a brand new Dodge Viper concept car. (That show ultimately aired on NBC.) Since that other Viper series centered on a quasi modern-day Knight Rider, and Cannell's series centered on crime fighters named "Viper", Cannell believed the name could be changed without sacrificing the creative concept of the series, and so the title was changed to Cobra. Three episodes had already been filmed when the title change took place, so it appears Scandal would have still been driving the Cobra even with the show called Viper.

Canadian rock band Saga was hired to produce the main theme and several additional songs for the series, to be featured in specific episodes, but most were never used. Their 1994 album Steel Umbrellas contained most of these songs. There were lyrics written and performed for the Cobra theme, "Someone is Out There," but only the instrumental version was used in the series.

Characters
Robert "Scandal" Jackson, Jr. (Michael Dudikoff): A martial artist, an expert marksman, an ex-Navy SEAL, and a former investigator for NSI, Scandal is perfectly suited to be Cobra's lead field operative. The only part of his past that remains is his vintage Cobra, which he helped his father restore when he was younger.

Danielle LaPoint (Allison Hossack): The daughter of Cobra's founder, Quentin Avery, Danielle is more or less Scandal's partner. Her mother was killed ten years earlier, and as a result she turned to helping victims like herself by working for Cobra. She holds a Ph.D in Psychology from Harvard University and was personally responsible for recruiting Scandal after arguing with her father that he was the perfect choice.

Dallas Cassel (James Tolkan): A former F.B.I. agent, Dallas is the director of Cobra. He almost got off on the wrong foot with Scandal when he faked Scandal's death in order to secure him an honorable discharge from the Navy, but Scandal ultimately realized it was for the best.

Episodes

Home media

Canada
On February 13, 2007, Visual Entertainment released Cobra: The Complete Series on DVD in Canada.  The 5-disc set also features several bonus features including episode summaries and a photo gallery.

United States
Mill Creek Entertainment released the complete series on DVD in the United States on September 29, 2009.

See also 
 T.H.E. Cat—a forerunner of the "expert(s) help(s) people in trouble" genre

References

External links
 
 Videos, screenshots and articles at So Bad It's Good

1990s American crime television series
Television series by Stephen J. Cannell Productions
Television series by 20th Century Fox Television
First-run syndicated television programs in the United States
1993 American television series debuts
1994 American television series endings
Fictional vigilantes
American action adventure television series
Television series created by Stephen J. Cannell